Clarissa Selwynne (26 February 1886 – 13 June 1948) was a British stage and film actress. She settled in the United States, working in Hollywood where she appeared in around 100 films.

Partial filmography

 Hearts in Exile (1915)
 The Master Hand (1915)
 The Masked Rider (1916)
 The Curse of Eve (1917)
 The Double Standard (1917)
 Princess Virtue (1917)
 Smashing Through (1918)
 The White Man's Law (1918)
 The Talk of the Town (1918)
 The Black Gate (1919)
 Girls (1919)
 The Parisian Tigress (1919)
 The Scarlet Shadow (1919)
 Out of the Storm (1920)
 The Cup of Fury (1920)
 Society Secrets (1921)
 Queenie (1921)
 Straight from Paris (1921)
 The Lure of Jade (1921)
 Up and at 'Em (1922)
 You Can't Get Away with It (1923)
 The Brass Bottle (1923)
 Black Oxen (1923)
 Why Women Remarry (1923)
 One Glorious Night (1924)
 Secrets (1924)
 Beau Brummel (1924)
 Mademoiselle Midnight (1924)
 The Last Man on Earth (1924)
 We Moderns (1925)
 Broadway Lady (1925)
 Infatuation (1925)
 The Fate of a Flirt (1925)
 The Devil Dancer (1927)
 Quarantined Rivals (1927)
 Jazz Mad (1928)
 The Heart of a Follies Girl (1928)
 Sinner's Parade (1928)
 My Man (1928)
 Confessions of a Wife (1928)
 Hard to Get (1929)
 The Isle of Lost Ships (1929)
 The Love Trap (1929)
 Lilies of the Field (1930)
 Slightly Married (1932)
 My Pal, the King (1932)
 Cynara (1932)
 Jane Eyre (1934)
 Melody of My Heart (1936)
 Everything Is Rhythm (1936)
 One Good Turn (1936)
 Sporting Love (1936)
 Everything in Life (1936)
 Call It a Day (1937)
 Women of Glamour (1937)

References

Bibliography
 Lynn Kear and James King. Evelyn Brent: The Life and Films of Hollywood's Lady Crook. McFarland, 2009.

External links

Clarissa Selwynne(Kinotv)

1886 births
1948 deaths
British film actresses
British stage actresses
British emigrants to the United States
Actresses from London